Marvel Comics Super Special: Blade Runner or just Blade Runner is a comic book adaptation of the film Blade Runner, published by Marvel Comics in 1982. It was written by Archie Goodwin with art by Al Williamson, Carlos Garzon with Dan Green and Ralph Reese.

Publication history
With a cover by Jim Steranko, the 45-page adaptation includes one possible explanation of the title's significance in story context: the narrative line, "Blade runner. You're always movin' on the edge."

This was issue 22 of the Marvel Comics Super Special series of titles, which by this time only printed Marvel's movie adaptations. It was reprinted in a two issue mini series but without the feature content contained in the special.

In the United Kingdom, it was reprinted as the Blade Runner Annual published by Grandreams. Again, the feature content of the original special was not reprinted.

The mass market paperback was published in black and white and contains images from the film, it is one of the rarest Marvel Comics paperbacks.

Plot
The comic followed the events of the film but attempts to fill in gaps in the script.

Reception
According to author Lawrence Raw, the Marvel adaptation was poorly received and widely ridiculed as having bad writing and misquoted lines of dialogue from the film script. Julian Darius of Sequart stated that "most movie adaptations aren’t great comics in their own right, and the Blade Runner adaptation’s no different" but also noted that "the adaptation is something of a mixed bag, but the more time one spends with it, the more one likes it."

Editions

Original single

Reprinted issues

Collected edition

See also
 Do Androids Dream of Electric Sheep? (comic book)
 Dust to Dust (comics)

References

External links 
 
 

1982 comics debuts
Blade Runner (franchise)
Blade Runner
Blade Runner
Comics by Archie Goodwin (comics)
Individual issues of comic series
Marvel Comics titles
Science fiction comics
Cyberpunk comics